Guy B. Larose (born July 31, 1967) is a Canadian former professional ice hockey player. He is the son of former NHL/WHA player Claude Larose.

Playing career
Larose was selected 2nd overall by the Guelph Platers in the 1984 Ontario Hockey League (OHL). He played major junior hockey in the OHL from 1984 to 1987 for the Guelph Platers and Ottawa 67's.

Larose was drafted 224th overall by the Buffalo Sabres in the 1985 NHL Entry Draft as a 17-year-old, but never signed a contract with the Sabres. He inked a free agent deal with the Winnipeg Jets in 1987, but spent most of his tenure in the American Hockey League for the Moncton Hawks, and managed to play just ten games for the Jets.  On January 22, 1991, he was traded to the New York Rangers for Rudy Poeschek, but never played for them and spent his entire tenure with the AHL's Binghamton Rangers, where he scored five goals in his very first game with Binghamton. He was traded again on December 26, 1991, to the Toronto Maple Leafs for Mike Stevens, and played the most games in the NHL for the team, but was unable to maintain a permanent role in the team, and again bounced around the leagues. On January 1, 1994, Larose was claimed off waivers by the Calgary Flames and played seven games for them. He signed with the Boston Bruins as a free agent, but only managed to play four playoff games, as the Bruins lost four games to one to the New Jersey Devils in the first round.

Larose spent the next few seasons in the International Hockey League, playing for the Detroit Vipers, Las Vegas Thunder and the Houston Aeros, before spending a season in the Deutsche Eishockey Liga in Germany for the Revier Löwen. He returned to the IHL and spent four seasons with the Chicago Wolves and won the Turner Cup in 2000.  He also won the Calder Cup in 2002 with the Chicago Wolves (AHL). He then retired in 2002 after splitting that year with the Wolves and the ECHL's Augusta Lynx.

Career statistics

Regular season and playoffs

References

External links 
 

1967 births
Living people
Augusta Lynx players
Binghamton Rangers players
Boston Bruins players
Buffalo Sabres draft picks
Calgary Flames players
Canadian expatriate ice hockey players in Germany
Canadian ice hockey centres
Chicago Wolves players
Detroit Vipers players
Guelph Platers players
Houston Aeros (1994–2013) players
Ice hockey people from Gatineau
Las Vegas Thunder players
Moncton Hawks players
Ottawa 67's players
Providence Bruins players
Revier Löwen players
Saint John Flames players
St. John's Maple Leafs players
Toronto Maple Leafs players
Winnipeg Jets (1979–1996) players